Apatema is a moth genus in the family Autostichidae.

Species
 Apatema acutivalva Gozmány, 2000
 Apatema apatemella Amsel, 1958
 Apatema apolausticum Gozmány, 1996
 Apatema baixerasi Vives, 2001
Apatema brunneum Falck & Karsholt, 2021
Apatema coarctella (Rebel, 1896)
Apatema confluellum Falck & Karsholt, 2021
 Apatema fasciata (Stainton, 1859)
Apatema griseum Falck & Karsholt, 2021
Apatema grancanariae Falck & Karsholt, 2021
Apatema helleri (Rebel, 1910)
 Apatema impunctella Amsel, 1940
 Apatema inexpectatum Gozmány, 1988
 Apatema junnilaineni Vives, 2001
Apatema lanzarotae Falck & Karsholt, 2021
Apatema lapalmae Falck & Karsholt, 2021
 Apatema lucidum Walsingham, 1908
 Apatema mediopallidum Walsingham, 1900
Apatema minimum Falck & Karsholt, 2021
 Apatema mixtum Falck & Karsholt, 2021
Apatema parodia (Gozmány, 1988)
Apatema pseudolucidum Falck & Karsholt, 2021
 Apatema sallyae Falck & Karsholt, 2021
Apatema skulei Falck & Karsholt, 2021
Apatema stadeli Falck & Karsholt, 2021
Apatema sutteri Gozmány, 1997
Apatema transversum Falck & Karsholt, 2021
 Apatema whalleyi (Popescu-Gorj & Capuse, 1965)

References

External links
  Images representing Apatema at Consortium for the Barcode of Life

 
Oegoconiinae
Moth genera
Taxa named by Thomas de Grey, 6th Baron Walsingham